A ger district is a form of residential district in Mongolian settlements. They usually consist of parcels with one or more detached houses or gers (hence the name), surrounded by two-metre high wooden fences.  In other countries, gers are known as yurts.

Most ger districts are not connected to water supplies, so people get their drinking water from public wells.  For a warm shower or a bath, there are bathhouses. Since there is no sewer system, ger district parcels usually have a pit toilet.

Small settlements, like sum centers, may consist almost exclusively of ger districts. Even in Mongolia's capital Ulaanbaatar, around 62% of the population live in such districts. However, only about 43% of the ger district residents in Ulaanbaatar actually live in gers. Some of the districts in Ulaanbaatar  have existed for more than 100 years, for example the one around Gandan, but many of those farther away from the city centre are the result of recent migration and the high price of other housing in Ulaanbaatar.

An oft-cited problem of ger districts in Ulaanbaatar and a number of other larger Mongolian cities is the air pollution (especially in winter) caused by the use of simple iron stoves for cooking and heating.

References 

Geography of Mongolia
Housing
Neighbourhoods by type